The 2003 Eastern District Council election was held on 23 November 2003 to elect all 36 elected members to the 45-member District Council.

Overall election results
Before election:

Change in composition:

References

2003 Hong Kong local elections